Eublemma roseonivea, the predaceous moth, is a moth of the family Erebidae. The species was first described by Francis Walker in 1863. It is found in China, Taiwan, the Philippines, Malaya and Borneo.

The larvae prey on lac insects.

References

Moths described in 1863
Boletobiinae